The Security and Trust Services API for J2ME (SATSA) is a collection of Java ME-based APIs that provides compliant devices with additional cryptographic security features. It permits the communication of a Java ME application with a smartcard through the APDU and Java Card RMI protocols. SATSA was developed under the Java Community Process as JSR 177.

It covers the following features, not natively supported by the original Java ME platform:

 Secure storage and exchange of data with third parties (such as the data exchanged during payment transactions).
 User identification and authentication during the exchange of data with third parties.

Implementation of SATSA
The SATSA API is considered an optional feature by Sun Microsystems, and is not mandated in all Java ME phones. However, device manufacturers may include it, if required. Several device manufacturers have already chosen to include SATSA in some products. Among them are several mobile phone manufacturers:

 Motorola
 Nokia (from Series 40 onwards, on a selective basis)
 Samsung
 Sony Ericsson (from JP-8 onwards)

See also

 Advanced Encryption Standard

Java device platform
Java specification requests